New Moves is the fifteenth studio album by American country music artist Don Williams. It was released on January 17, 1986 via Capitol Records. The album includes the singles "We've Got a Good Fire Goin'", "Heartbeat in the Darkness", "Then It's Love" "Señorita" and "I'll Never Be in Love Again".

Track listing

Chart performance

References

1986 albums
Don Williams albums
Albums produced by Garth Fundis
Capitol Records albums